Normal is a station on Line 2 of the Mexico City Metro system.  It is located in the Miguel Hidalgo municipality of Mexico City, northwest of the city centre, near the Calzada México-Tacuba. In 2019, the station had an average ridership of 35,260 passengers per day.

Name and pictogram
The station name refers to the nearby Escuela Normal de Maestros, an academy for elementary school teachers, often referred to simply as Normal, hence the station designation as Normal. The station pictogram depicts a stylized design of the tower of the Normal main building inaugurated in 1947 by Jaime Torres Bodet, then Minister of Education of Mexico.

History
The station opened on 14 September 1970 as part of the second stretch of Line 2, from Pino Suárez to Tacuba.

Corpus Christi Massacre

On 10 June 1971, riot police and students who were protesting against the Mexican government, clashed in the vicinity of the metro station. Nearly 120 protesters were killed, among them a fourteen-year-old boy. The massacre was depicted in the 2018 Alfonso Cuarón's film Roma.

The station has pictures and testimonies about the massacre on the walls, as well as a memorial plaque unveiled in 2001 by Mexico City's government.

General information
The station is located on the Calzada México-Tacuba and serves the following neighborhoods: Colonia Tlaxpana, Colonia Un Hogar para Nosotros and Colonia Agricultura. In 2019, it was the fourth busiest station in Line 2.

Ridership

Entrances
Northeast: Calzada México-Tacuba and Avenida de los Maestros, Colonia Tlaxpana
Northwest: Calzada México-Tacuba and Avenida de los Maestros, Colonia Tlaxpana
South: Calzada México-Tacuba and Tláloc street, Colonia Un Hogar para Nosotros.

Gallery

See also 
 List of Mexico City metro stations
 Corpus Christi massacre

References

External links 

Normal
Railway stations opened in 1970
1970 establishments in Mexico
Mexico City Metro stations in Miguel Hidalgo, Mexico City
Railway stations in Mexico at university and college campuses